Henry George James (18 June 1877 – 13 October 1940) was an Australian rules footballer who played with Fitzroy in the Victorian Football League (VFL).

Sources

External links

 

1877 births
1940 deaths
Fitzroy Football Club players
Australian rules footballers from Melbourne
People from Kensington, Victoria